Louisiana is a state located in the Southern United States. According to the 2020 United States census, Louisiana is the 25th most populous state with  inhabitants and the 33rd largest by land area spanning  of land. Louisiana is divided into 64 parishes, which are equivalent to counties, and contains 304 municipalities consisting of four consolidated city-parishes, and 304 cities, towns, and villages.

According to the 2015 Louisiana Laws Revised Statutes, residents of any unincorporated area may propose to incorporate as a municipality if the area meets prescribed minimum population thresholds. Municipal corporations are divided based on population into three classes: cities, towns, and villages. Those having five thousand inhabitants or more are classified as cities; those having less than five thousand but more than one thousand inhabitants are classified as towns; and those having one thousand or fewer inhabitants are classified as villages. The governor may change the classification of the municipality if the board of aldermen requests a change and a census shows that the population has increased or decreased making it eligible for a different classification. Municipalities are granted powers to perform functions required by local governments including the levy and collection of taxes and to assume indebtedness.

The largest municipality by population in Louisiana in 2020 is New Orleans with 383,997 residents, and the smallest is Mound with 12 residents. The first municipality to incorporate was Natchitoches in 1712 and the newest is Central in 2005.

List of municipalities

See also
Louisiana census statistical areas
List of census-designated places in Louisiana
List of unincorporated communities in Louisiana

Notes

References

 
L
Citiestowns
Louisiana
Louisiana